Ray Roberts may be:
Ray Roberts (1913–1992), congressman from Texas
Ray Roberts (American football) (born 1969), American football player
Ray Roberts (baseball) (1895–1962), baseball pitcher